Stigmella nostrata is a moth of the family Nepticulidae. It is found in the Amur and Primorye regions of Russia.

The larvae feed on Pyrus ussuriensis. They probably mine the leaves of their host.

External links
Nepticulidae collection of Siberian Zoological Museum
To the knowledge of small moths (Microlepidoptera) of the Bolshekhekhtsirskii Nature Reserve (Khabarovsk District)

Nepticulidae
Moths of Asia
Moths described in 1984